Fernando Acevedo Portugues (born July 26, 1946) is a retired track and field athlete from Peru, who won the bronze medal in the men's 400 metres at the 1971 Pan American Games. He represented his native country at the 1968 Summer Olympics in Mexico City and at the 1972 Summer Olympics in Munich, West Germany.  He is still the Peruvian National record holder in the 200 metres and the 400 metres and was the anchor man of the 4x400 metres relay team, the 200, 400 and relay set in a 4-day period at the Pan American Games.

Achievements

References
1971 Year Ranking

External links

1946 births
Living people
Peruvian male sprinters
Athletes (track and field) at the 1968 Summer Olympics
Athletes (track and field) at the 1972 Summer Olympics
Olympic athletes of Peru
Athletes (track and field) at the 1967 Pan American Games
Athletes (track and field) at the 1971 Pan American Games
Pan American Games bronze medalists for Peru
Pan American Games medalists in athletics (track and field)
Medalists at the 1971 Pan American Games
20th-century Peruvian people